Solody is a rural locality (a selo) in Petropavlovskoye Rural Settlement, Bolshesosnovsky District, Perm Krai, Russia. The population was 166 as of 2010. There are 8 streets.

Geography 
Solody is located 33 km southwest of Bolshaya Sosnova (the district's administrative centre) by road. Seletki is the nearest rural locality.

References 

Rural localities in Bolshesosnovsky District